Abisara cameroonensis, the Cameroon Judy, is a butterfly in the family Riodinidae. It is found in Nigeria and Cameroon. The habitat consists of montane secondary forests, where it is found along streams.

References

Butterflies described in 2003
Abisara